This is a list of hospitals in Argentina. There are 5,012 hospitals in Argentina, 70% of which are private and the remaining 30% of which are public.

City of Buenos Aires
ALPI, Instituto de Rehabilitación "Marcelo Fitte"
CEMIC, Av. Las Heras 2900
CEMIC, Galván 4102
FLENI, Fundación Lucha Contra Enfermedades Neurológicas Infantiles
FUNDALEU, Fundación Argentina Contra la Leucemia
Hospital Aeronáutico Central
Hospital Militar Central
Hospital Naval "Dr. Pedro Mallo"
Complejo Médico Policial "Churruca-Visca"
Hospital de Clínicas "José de San Martín" (UBA)
Hospital Odontológico Universitario (UBA)
Hospital General de Agudos "Donación Francisco Santojanni", Mataderos
Hospital Municipal de Oncología "Marie Curie", Agronomía
Hospital de Niños "Pedro Elizalde"
Hospital "Manuel Belgrano"
Hospital Alemán
Hospital Español
Hospital Centro Gallego de Buenos Aires
Hospital Infanto Juvenil "C. Tobar García",  Barracas
Hospital Nacional de Pediatría "Profesor Dr. Juan P. Garrahan", Parque Patricios
Hospital Italiano de Buenos Aires
Hospital Francés
Hospital Británico de Buenos Aires
Hospital Israelita - ISRAMED
Hospital y Administración Nacional de Laboratorios e Institutos de Salud "Dr. Carlos G. Malbrán", ANLIS
Hospital de Infecciosas "Dr. Francisco Javier Muñiz", Parque Patricios
Hospital General de Agudos  "D. Vélez Sarsfield", Liniers
Hospital de Emergencias Psiquiátricas Marcelo Torcuato de Alvear, Agronomía
Hospital Odontológico (ex Nacional), Recoleta
Hospital de Odontología "José Dueñas", Almagro
Hospital de Odontología Infantil "Don Benito Quinquela Martín", La Boca
Hospital de Gastroenterología "B. Udaondo", Barracas
Hospital General de Agudos "Cosme Argerich", La Boca
Hospital Neuropsiquiátrico de Varones "J. T. Borda", Barracas
Hospital General de Agudos "Dr. Carlos G. Durand", Caballito
Hospital General de Agudos "Dr. Juan A. Fernández", Palermo
Hospital de Niños "Ricardo Gutiérrez", Palermo
Hospital General de Niños "Pedro de Elizalde", Constitución
Hospital de Rehabilitación Respiratoria "María Ferrer"
Hospital General de Agudos "Dr. Ignacio Pirovano", Coghland
Hospital Municipal de Quemados, Caballito
Hospital General de Agudos "Dr. J. M. Ramos Mejía", Balvanera
Hospital Materno Infantil "Ramón Sardá", Parque Patricios
Hospital Nacional "Bernardino Rivadavia", Recoleta
Hospital Oftalmológico "Dr. Pedro Lagleyze", Villa Gral. Mitre
Hospital Municipal de Oftalmología "Santa Lucía", San Cristóbal
Hospital General de Agudos "Dr. Enrique Tornú", Villa Ortúzar
Hospital de Rehabilitación Respiratoria "M. Ferrer", Barracas
Hospital de Salud Mental de Mujeres "Braulio Moyano", Barracas
Hospital General de Agudos "Dr. Abel Zubizarreta", Villa Devoto
Hospital General de Agudos "Dr. T. Alvarez", Flores
Hospital General de Agudos "J. A. Penna", Parque Patricios
Hospital General de Agudos "P. Piñero", Flores
Hospital de Rehabilitacion "Manuel Rocca". Villa Real
Hospital Udaondo
Instituto de Zoonosis "Luis Pasteur", Caballito
Instituto de Rehabilitación Psicofísica "I RE P". Belgrano
Instituto de Cardiología y Cirugía Cardiovascular "F. Favaloro"
Instituto Dupuytren de Traumatología y Ortopedia. Boedo
Instituto de Investigaciones Médicas "Alfredo Lanari" (UBA)
Instituto de Oncología "Angel H. Roffo" (UBA)
Instituto de Tisioneumología "Raúl F. Vacarezza" (UBA)

Province of Buenos Aires
Hospital Interzonal General de Agudos "General José de San Martín", La Plata
H. "El Cruce", Florencio Varela
H. Municipal General "Anita Ellicagaray, A. Gonzáles Cháves
H. Interzonal General de Agudos "Dr. J. Penna", Bahía Blanca
Hospital Municipal de Agudos Dr Leónidas Lucero, Bahía Blanca
H. Menor "Ing. White", Ingeniero White
H. Municipal de Agudos "María Eva Duarte de Perón"
H. Municipal, Oriente
H. Municipal "Dr. Cabrera", Coronel Pringles
H. Municipal "Eva Perón", Punta Alta
H. Municipal "Dr. Raúl A. Caccavo", Coronel Suárez
H. Municipal "Lucero del Alba", Huanguelén
H. Municipal "Dr. Joaquín Llambías", Guaminí
H. Menor "Dr. Ramón Carrillo", Monte Hermoso
H. Municipal de Agudos "Dr. Pedro Ecay", Carmen de Patagones
H. Municipal, Stroeder
H. Municipal, Villalonga
H. Municipal, "Dr. Emilio Ferreyra", Necochea
H. Municipal "Gobernador Ugarte", Puán
H. Municipal "Villa Iris", Villa Iris
H. Local "General San Martín", Carhué
H. de Ancianos "General N. Levalle", Carhué
H. "Dr. Noé Yarcho", Rivera
H. "Demetrio carmelo Layarte", Villa Mazza
Hospital Nacional de Lepra "Dr. Baldomero Sommer", RP 24, 3.5 km RN 6, Partido General Rodríguez
Hospital Nacional de Agudos "Profesor Dr. Alejandro Posadas", El Palomar
Instituto Nacional de Enfermedades Virales Humanas "Dr. Julio I. Maiztegui", INEVH, Pergamino
Hospital Regional de Agudos "San José", Pergamino
Hospital Regional de Agudos "San Felipe", San Nicolás de los Arroyos
Hospital “Virgen del Carmen”, Zárate

http://www.ms.gba.gov.ar/imagenes/Guia_2005.pdf

Northern area of Greater Buenos Aires

 Austral University Hospital, Pilar

H. Municipal "Dr. Bernardo Houssay, Vicente López
H. Zonal de Agudos y Crónicos "Dr. Cetrángolo, Vicente López
H. de Niños Municipal "San Isidro", San Isidro
H. Municipal de San Isidro, San Isidro
H. Zonal General de Agudos "M. V. de Martínez", Tigre
H. Zonal General de Agudos "Petrona V. de Cordero", San Fernando
H. Municipal Dr. D. E. Thompson, San Martín
H. Interzonal General de Agudos "Eva Perón" (ex Castex), San Martín
H Zonal de Agudos "Gral. Manuel Belgrano", San Martín
H. Municipal "Dr. R. Larcade", San Miguel
Clínica Independencia, Munro
Clínica Olivos, Olivos
Sanatorio "San Lucas", San Isidro
H. Materno Infantil "San Isidro", San Isidro
Hospital Juan C. Sanguinetti, Pilar (Víctor Vergani 860)

Western area of Greater Buenos Aires 
H. Zonal General de Agudos "Prof. Dr. Ramón Carrillo", Ciudadela
H. Interzonal General de Agudos "Dr. L. Güemes", Haedo
Posadas
H. Zonal General de Agudos "Dr. Diego Paroissien", Isidro Casanova
H. "San Juan de Dios", Ramos Mejía
Clínica Güemes, Luján
Clínica Modelo Morón, Morón
H. Virtual de Morón

South area of Greater Buenos Aires 
Emilio Burgwardt Hospital, Longchamps
Clínica Juncal, Temperley
Clínica Modelo de Lanús, Lanús
Clínica Sanatorio "Modelo", Quilmes Oeste
H. Interzonal General de Agudos "Evita", Lanús
H. Interzonal General de Agudos "Dr. Pedro Fiorito", Avellaneda
H. Interzonal General de Agudos "Pte. Perón", Sarandí
H. Zonal General de Agudos "Dr. Isidoro Iriarte, Quilmes
H. Interzonal General de Agudos "L. C. de Gandulfo", Lomas de Zamora
H. Zonal General de Agudos "Lucio Meléndez", Adrogué
H. Interzonal General de Agudos "J. A. Estévez", Temperley
H. Municipal "Mi Pueblo", Florencio Varela
H. Zonal General de Agudos Descentralizado "Evita Pueblo", Berazategui
H. Zonal de Agudos Ezeiza, Ezeiza
Policlínico UOM, Avellaneda

La Plata City Hospitals
H. Interzonal General de Agudos "General San Martín"
H. Interzonal General de Agudos "Prof. Dr. R. Rossi"
H. Zonal General de Agudos "Dr R. Gutiérrez"
H. Zonal General de Agudos "San Roque", Manuel B. Gonnet
H. Interzonal General de Agudos y Crónicos "San Juan de Dios"
H. Interzonal General de Agudos "Sor María Ludovica"
H. Español "de La Plata"
H. Italiano "de La Plata"
Hospital Privado Sudamericano

Province of Catamarca
H. Provincial José Chain, Andalgalá
H. Regional Belén, Belén
H. Zonal de Icaño, Icaño
H. "Roberto Ramón Carrillo", Pomán
H. San José, Santa María
H. Área Nº 3 "La Merced", La Merced
H. Distrital Villa D, Las Tejas De Valle Viejo
H. "El Rodeo", El Rodeo
H. R. R. Carro, Chumbicha
H. "San José, Piedra Blanca
H. Zonal de Recreo, Recreo
H. "Dr. Liborio Forte", Recreo
H. Distrital de Saujil, Saujil
H. Zonal "San Juan Bautista", Tinogasta

City of Catamarca
H. Interzonal "San Juan Bautista"
H. Centro de Rehabilitación
H. Centro de Salud
H. Interzonal de Niños

Province of Chaco

City of Resistencia
H. "Perrando"
 H. "4 de Junio", Sáenz Peña

Province of Córdoba
H. Vecinal Achiras, Achiras
H. Vecinal Adelia María, Adelia María
H. Municipal Alcira, Alcira
H. de Beneficencia, Alejandro
H. Vecinal, Alejandro
H. M. Salvador Esca,  Almafuerte
H. Arturo Humberto, Alta Gracia
Policlínico Ferroviario, Alta Gracia
H. de Arias, Arias
H. Municipal "Dr. Carlos Julio Rodríguez", Arroyito
Complejo Asistencial Regional, Bell Ville
H. Municipal, Buchardo
H. Vecinal, Camilo Aldao
H. Cañada De Luque, Cañada de Luque
H. Municipal "San José", Canals
H. Aurelio Crespo, Cruz del Eje
H. Vicente Agüero, Jesús María
H. "San Antonio de Padua", Río Cuarto
H. Domingo Funes, Santa Maria de Punilla
H. San Vicente de Paul, Villa del Rosario
H. Regional de Villa Dolores, Villa Dolores
H. Regional Pasteur, Villa Maria

City of Córdoba, Argentina
H. Aeronáutico Cordoba
H. Amelia S L de
H. Español
H. Gustavo A
H. Hernan
H. Italiano Web site
H. José
H. Mediterráneo Central
H. Militar Cordoba
H. Nacional de Clínicas
Policlínico Policial
H. Privado S.A. Web site
H. Roberto J
H. Sagrado Corazón De Jesús
Instituto Del Quemado
H. Aeronáutico, Av. Colón 479
H. Aeronáutico, Av. F Aérea Arg km 6,5
H. Córdoba
H. de Niños
H. de Pediatría
H. de Urgencias
H. Infantil Municipal
H. Materno Provincial
H. Misericordia, Pje Caeiro 1259
H. Misericordia, Belgrano 1502
H. Misericordia, Ayacucho 1700
H. Neuropsiquiátrico
H. Rawson
H. San Roque
H. T. C. de Allende
H. Maternidad Nacional
Policlínico Ferroviario
Centro Dionisi de Ginecología y Cirugía Ginecológica Avanzada Web centrodionisi.com
Centro de Ginecología Dr. Dionisi, Av. Vélez Sarsfield 576, Córdoba Capital

Province of Corrientes

City of Corrientes
H. "Ángela I. de Llano"
H. Escuela "General San Martín"
H. de Niños
H. Psiquiátrico
H. Geriátrico
Instituto de Cardiología

Province of Formosa

City of Formosa
H. Central
H. de "La Madre y el Niño"

Province of Mendoza
H. Central
H. Luis Lagomaggiore
H. Humberto Notti
H. Italiano
H. Español
H. Español del Sur Mendocino
H. Militar
H. Alfredo Metraux
H. Diego Paroissien
H. Domingo Sicoli
H. Carlos Saporiti
H. Antonio Scaravelli
H. Victorino Tagarelli
H. Luis Chrabalowki
H. Teodoro Schestakow
H. Héctor E. Gailhac
H. Alfredo Perrupato
H. El Carmen
H. José N. Lencinas
H. Arturo Illia
H. Santa Rosa
H. Eva Perón
H. General Alvear
H. Malargüe
H. El Sauce
H. Carlos Pereyra
H. San Juan de Dios
H. Privado de Mendoza
H. Universitario
Clínica Francesa
Clínica Suiza
Clínica Sanatorio Mitre
Clínica Arizu
Clínica Schweizer
Clínica de ojos (Fundación Dr. Zaldívar)
Clínica Pelegrina
Clínica Fleming
Policlínico Sanatorio Gasa
Clínica Colón
Clínica Godoy Cruz
Clínica Las Heras
Clínica del Niño
Clínica de ojos de San Rafael Dr. Yudowicz
Clínica Luque
Sanatorio Policlínico Cuyo
Clínica Santa María
H Santa Isabel  de Hungría
 H Ramón  Carrillo

Province of Misiones
H. de Área Apóstoles, Apóstoles
Clínica Vecchia, Puerto Rico

Province of Neuquen

City of Neuquen
H. Provincial Neuquen "Prof. Dr. Castro Rendon"
H. General "Horacio Heller"
H. General "Bouquet Roldan"
Centro Quirurgico Neuquen
Centro Oncologico San Peregrino
Clínica Pasteur
Policlínico Neuquen
Clánica Pediátrica "San Lucas"
Clínica "San Agustín"
H. Centenario
H. Plottier
H. Zapala
H. Chos Malal
H. San Martín de los Andes
H. Cutral Co

Province of Santa Cruz
H. Regional Río Gallegos - Río Gallegos

Province of Santa Fe
H. Escuela Eva Perón, Granadero Baigorria
H. "San Carlos", Casilda
H. "Anselmo Gamen", Villa Gobernador Gálvez
H. "San José", Cañada de Gómez
H. Central, Reconquista
H. "A. Gutiérrez", Venado Tuerto

Rosario
Centro Regional de Salud Mental Dr. Agudo Ávila
H. de Niños Zona Norte
H. Geriátrico Provincial
H. Municipal Intendente Carrasco
Hospital Provincial de Rosario
Hospital Provincial del Centenario
H. Italiano Giuseppe Garibaldi de Rosario
H. Municipal Juan B. Alberdi
Sanatorio Británico
H. Español de Rosario
H. Unione e Benevolenza
H. de Niños Víctor J. Vilela
H. "Roque Sáenz Peña"
H. de Emergencias Clemente Álvarez (HECA)
Enfermeria Anglo Alemana (closed 1914)

San Lorenzo
H. Granaderos a Caballo

Province of Tucumán
H. Aguilares, Aguilares
H. de Concepción, Aguilares
H. Regional Concepción, Concepción
H. Privado SRL, Concepción
H. Belascuain, Concepción
H. Bella Vista, Bella Vista
H. "Gómez Llueca, Simoca
H. "Gral. Lamadrid", Monteros
H. "Juan Bautista Alberdi", Juan Bautista Alberdi
H. "Gral. Lamadrid ", Graneros
H. "Los Sarmientos", Los Sarmientos
H. "Mario Stivala", La Cocha
H. Parajón Ortiz, Famailla
H. "Santa Ana", Santa Ana
H. Tafí del Valle, Tafí Del Valle
H. Trancas, Trancas
H. Avellaneda, Las Talitas
H. "Ramón Humberto, Lamadrid
H. "Santa Lucía", Santa Lucía

City of Tucumán
H. Ángel C. Padilla
H. Centro de Salud "Zenón Sant"
H. "del Niño Jesús"
H. "Juan Obarrio"
H. "Nicolás Avellaneda"
H. Privado de Flebología
H. Privado de Ojos
H. Psiquiátrico "del Carmen"
H. de Niños Soc. Arg. de Pediatría

References

 Hospitals in Spanish
 List of hospitals in Argentina
 Hospitales psiquiatricos en Cordoba Argentina in Spanish
 Global Health Intelligence, Information on Healthcare in emerging markets.  Retrieved 12/10/14.
 Registro Federal de Establecimientos de Salud, Federal Registry of Health Institutions.  Retrieved 01/08/15.

Argentina
 
Hospitals
Argentina